Kochyovo (Köć) is a rural locality (a selo) and the administrative center of Kochyovskoye Rural Settlement and Kochyovsky District, Perm Krai, Russia. The population was 3,504 as of 2010. There are 54 streets.

Geography 
It is located on the Sepol River.

References 

Rural localities in Kochyovsky District